This list of the Paleozoic life of Minnesota contains the various prehistoric life-forms whose fossilized remains have been reported from within the US state of Minnesota and are between 538.8 and 252.17 million years of age.

A

 †Abludoglyptocrinus –
 †Abludoglyptocrinus charltoni
 †Acanthocrania
 †Acanthocrania granulosa
 †Acanthocrania setigeria
 †Acanthoparypha
 †Acanthoparypha evetti
 †Actinoceras
 †Actinoceras beloitense
 †Actinoceras bigsbyi
 †Actinoceras gravicentrum
 †Actinoceras janesvillensis
 †Actinodiscus
 †Aechmina
 †Aechmina cuspidata
 †Aechmina ionensis
 †Agelacrinites
 †Alaskadiscus
 †Alaskadiscus subacutus
 †Allodesma – type locality for genus
 †Allodesma subellipticum – type locality for species
 †Allumettoceras
 †Allumettoceras carletonense – or unidentified comparable form
 †Allumettoceras planodorsatum
 †Ambonychia
 †Ambonychia tenuis
 †Ambonychiopsis
 †Amecystis
 †Amecystis woodi
 †Americoncha
 †Americoncha marginata
 †Amorphognathus
 †Amorphognathus superbus
 †Amphilichas
 †Amphilichas cucullus – or unidentified comparable form
 †Amygdalocystites
 †Anaspyroceras
 †Anaspyroceras anellus
 †Anaspyroceras calvini
 †Anaspyroceras clermontense
 †Anaspyroceras perroti
 †Anazyga
 †Anazyga recurvirostra
 †Anolotichia
 †Anolotichia impolita
 †Antiplectoceras – tentative report
 †Anulocrinus
 †Anulocrinus forrestonensis
 †Aparchites
 †Aparchites barbatus
 †Aparchites carinatus
 †Aparchites chatfieldensis
 †Aparchites ellipticus
 †Aparchites fimbriatus
 †Aparchites macrus
 †Aparchites paratumida
 †Apycnodiscus
 †Archaeocrinus
 †Archaeocrinus obconicus
 †Archinacella
 †Archinacella cingulata
 †Archinacella deleta
 †Archinacella simplex
 †Archinacella simulatrix
 †Archinacella valida
 †Aristerella
 †Armenoceras
 †Armenoceras clermontense
 †Armenoceras iowense
 †Arthroclema
 †Arthroclema armatum
 †Arthropora
 †Arthropora simplex
 †Arthrostylus
 †Arthrostylus conjunctus
 †Arthrostylus obliquus
 †Aspidopora
 †Astreptodictya
 †Astreptodictya acuta
 †Astreptodictya elegans
 †Astreptodictya fimbriata
 †Astreptodictya pumila
 †Astrocystites
 †Ateleocystites
 †Ateleocystites guttenbergensis
 †Athrophragma
 †Athrophragma foliata
 †Austinella
 †Austinella kankakensis –

B

 †Bairdiocypris –
 †Bairdiocypris granti
 †Basilicus
 †Basilicus barrandi
 †Bassleratia
 †Bassleratia typa
 †Bathyurus
 †Bathyurus longispinus
 †Batostoma
 †Batostoma fertile
 †Batostoma magnopora
 †Batostoma winchelli
 †Bellimurina
 †Bellimurina charlottae
 †Bellornatia
 †Bellornatia tricollis
 †Belodina
 †Belodina compressa
 †Belodina confluens
 †Beloitoceras
 †Beloitoceras carveri
 †Beloitoceras grafense
 †Beloitoceras houghtoni
 †Beloitoceras huronense – or unidentified comparable form
 †Beloitoceras janesvillense
 †Beloitoceras lycum
 †Beloitoceras norwoodi
 †Beloitoceras pandion
 †Beloitoceras plebeium
 †Beloitoceras whitneyi
 †Berkeia – type locality for genus
 †Berkeia typica – type locality for species
 †Beyrichia
 †Beyrichia irregularis
 †Bodeiceras
 †Bodeiceras oxygonium
 †Bollia
 †Bollia regularis
 †Bollia ruthae
 †Bollia subaequata
 †Bollia subaequeata
  †Bothriocidaris
 †Bothriocidaris solemi
 †Brachytomaria
 †Brachytomaria semele
 †Bromidella
 †Bromidella depressa
 †Bromidella rhomboides
 †Bryantodina
 †Bryantodina abrupta
 †Bryantodina typicalis
 †Bucania
 †Bucania elliptica
 †Bucania halli
 †Bucania minnesotensis
 †Bucania sublata
 †Bullatella
 †Bullatella granilabiatus
 †Bullatella granlabiatus
 †Bumastoides
 †Bumastoides milleri
 †Bumastoides porrectus
  †Bumastus
 †Bumastus orbicaudatus
 †Byrsolopsina
 †Byrsolopsina centipunctata
 †Byrsolopsina normella
 †Byrsolopsina ovata
 †Byrsolopsina planilateralis
 Bythocypris
 †Bythocypris curta
 †Bythocypris furnishi
 †Bythopora
 †Bythopora subgracilis –

C

 †Calceocrinus
 †Calceocrinus gossmani
 †Calceocrinus levorsoni
  †Calymene
 †Calymene mamillate
 †Calymene winchelli
 †Camaraspis
 †Camaraspis convexus
 †Camaraspoides
 †Camaraspoides berkeyi
 †Camellaspongia – type locality for genus
 †Camellaspongia tumula – type locality for species
  †Cameroceras
 †Cameroceras alternatum – or unidentified comparable form
 †Cameroceras hennepini
 †Cameroceras inopinatum – type locality for species
 †Cameroceras stillwaterense – type locality for species
 †Campylorthis
 †Campylorthis deflecta
 †Carabocrinus
 †Carabocrinus dicyclicus
 †Carabocrinus magnificus
 †Carabocrinus oogyi
 †Carabocrinus radiatus
 †Carabocrinus slocomi
 †Carinaropsis
 †Carinaropsis cymbula
 †Carinaropsis minima
 †Cataschisma
 †Cataschisma convexum
 †Centrocyrtoceras
 †Centrocyrtoceras annulatum
 †Centrocyrtoceras duplicostatum
 †Centrocyrtoceras rotundum
 †Ceratopea
 †Ceratopea canadensis
 †Ceratopea parvum – type locality for species
 †Ceratopea pygmaea – type locality for species
 †Ceratopsis
 †Ceratopsis chambersi
 †Ceratopsis humilinoda
 †Ceratopsis quadrifida
 †Ceraurinella
 †Ceraurinella scofieldi
 †Ceraurinella templetoni
 †Ceraurinus
 †Ceraurinus icarus
  †Ceraurus
 †Ceraurus pleurexanthemus
 †Ceraurus pleurexanthomus
 †Charactoceras
 †Charactoceras laddi
 †Chariocephalus
 †Chariocephalus whitfieldi
 †Chasmatopora
 †Chasmatopora reticulata
 †Cheilocephalus
 †Cheilocephalus stcroixensis
 †Cheirocrinus
 †Chidleyenoceras
 †Chirognathus
 †Chirognathus duodactylus
 †Cincinnaticrinus
 †Cincinnaticrinus varibrachialus
  †Cincinnetina
 †Cincinnetina minnesotensis – type locality for species
 †Clathrospira
 †Clathrospira conica
 †Clathrospira subconica
 †Cleiocrinus
 †Cleionychia
 †Coelocerodontus
 †Coelocerodontus trigonius
 †Colpodon
 †Colpomya
  †Constellaria
 †Constellaria varia
 †Conularia
 †Cordylodus
 †Cordylodus delicatus
 †Cornites
 †Coronocystis
 †Coronocystis durandensis
 †Cotteroceras
 †Cotteroceras compressum
 †Cotylahindia – type locality for genus
 †Cotylahindia panaca – type locality for species
  †Crania
 †Crania reversa
 †Craniops
 †Craniops minor
 †Cremacrinus
 †Cremacrinus arctus
 †Cremacrinus crossmani
 †Cremacrinus gerki
 †Cremacrinus guttenbergensis
 †Cremacrinus punctatus
 †Cryptophyllus
 †Cryptophyllus obloides
 †Cryptophyllus oboloides
 †Cryptophyllus sulcatus
 †Crytoniodus
 †Crytoniodus complicatus
 †Ctenobolbina
 †Ctenobolbina emaciata
 †Ctenobolbina maquoketensis
 †Ctenodonta
 †Ctenodonta novicea
 †Ctenodonta oviformis – type locality for species
 †Ctenodonta similis
 †Ctenodonta subnasuta – type locality for species
 †Culumbodina
 †Culumbodina penna
 †Cuneamya
 †Cupulocrinus
 †Cupulocrinus canaliculatus
 †Cupulocrinus conjugans
 †Cupulocrinus graciis – or unidentified related form
 †Cupulocrinus gracilis
 †Cupulocrinus humilis
 †Cupulocrinus jewetti
 †Cupulocrinus latibrachiatus – or unidentified related form
 †Cupulocrinus levorsoni
 †Cupulocrinus molanderi
 †Cupulocrinus plattevillensis
 †Curtognathus
 †Cyclendoceras
 †Cyclendoceras annulatum – or unidentified comparable form
 †Cyclocystoides
 †Cyclocystoides halli
 †Cyclonema
 †Cyclonema aiens
 †Cyclonema percarinata
 †Cyclonema textilis
 †Cyclonema varicosum
 †Cyclospira
 †Cyclospira bisulcata
 †Cymatonota
 †Cyptendoceras
 †Cyptendoceras ruedemanni
 †Cyrtocerina
 †Cyrtocerina crenulata
 †Cyrtocerina schoolcrafti
 †Cyrtodonta
 †Cyrtodonta descriptus
 †Cyrtodonta dignus
 †Cyrtodonta grandis
 †Cyrtodontula
 †Cyrtodontula praecipita – type locality for species
 †Cyrtoizoceras
 †Cyrtoizoceras minneapolis
 †Cyrtolites
 †Cyrtolites dilatus
 †Cyrtolites disjunctus
 †Cyrtolites minor
 †Cyrtolites ornatus
 †Cyrtolites retrorsus
 †Cyrtonellopsis
 †Cyrtonellopsis vetulum
 †Cyrtospira
 †Cyrtospira wykoffensis
 †Cyrtostropha
 †Cyrtostropha salteri –

D

 †Daidia
 †Daidia subconica – type locality for species
 †Dalmanella
 †Dalmanella rara – or unidentified comparable form
 †Dalmanella sculpta – tentative report
 †Dapsilodus
 †Dapsilodus mutatus
 †Deceptrix
 †Deckeroceras
 †Deckeroceras clermontense
 †Deiroceras
 †Deiroceras scofieldi
 †Dekayella
 †Dekayella praenuntia
 †Delotaxis
 †Dendrocrinus
 †Dendrocrinus acutidactylus – or unidentified related form
 †Dendrocrinus casei
 †Desmograptus
 †Desmograptus cancellatus
 †Diceromyonia
 †Diceromyonia ignota
 †Dicranella
 †Dicranella bicornis
 †Dicranella marginata
 †Dicranella marinata
 †Dicranella simplex
 †Dicranella spinosa
 †Dicranella typa
 †Diestoceras
 †Diestoceras alceum
 †Diestoceras clarkei
 †Dilobella
 †Dilobella simplex
 †Dilobella typa
 †Dinorthis
 †Dinorthis pectinella
 †Diorthelasma
 †Diorthelasma weissi – type locality for species
  †Diplograptus
 †Diplograptus peosta
 †Doleroides
 †Doleroides pervetus
 †Dolichoharpes
 †Dolichoharpes ottawaensis
 †Drepanoistodus
 †Drepanoistodus suberectus
 †Drumaspis
 †Drumaspis sabulosa
 †Drumaspis tanycodia
 †Dvorakia
 †Dvorakia chattertoni – type locality for species
 †Dvorakia klapperi –

E

 †Eccyliopterus
 †Eccyliopterus owenanus
 †Ectenaspis
 †Ectenaspis beckeri – type locality for species
 †Ectenocrinus
 †Ectenocrinus raymondi
 †Ectenocrinus simplex
 †Ectomaria
 †Ectomaria pagoda
 †Ectomaria prisca
 †Edrioaster
 †Edrioaster bigsbyi
 †Ellesmeria
 †Ellesmeria scobeyi
 †Ellesmeroceras
 †Ellesmeroceras winonicum
 †Ellipsocephaloides
 †Ellipsocephaloides curtus
 †Ellipsocephaloides gracilis
 †Elliptocryprites
 †Elliptocryprites paracylindrica – type locality for species
 †Elliptocyprites
 †Elliptocyprites paracylindrica – type locality for species
  †Endoceras
 †Endoceras atkinsonense
 †Endoceras clarkei
 †Endoceras clermontense
 †Endoceras decorahense
 †Endoceras eburneolum – type locality for species
 †Endoceras fulgar
 †Endoceras gracillimum
 †Endoceras kayi
 †Endoceras proteiforme
 †Endoceras thomasi
 †Eobelodina
 †Eobelodina hormacola
 †Eochonetes
 †Eochonetes recedens
 †Eomonorachus
 †Eomonorachus intermedius
 †Eoplectodonta
 †Eoplectodonta recedens
 †Eoplectodonta saxea
 †Eoschmidtella
 †Eoschmidtella umbonata
 †Eotomaria
 †Eotomaria dryope
 †Eotomaria vicina
 †Ephippiorthoceras
 †Ephippiorthoceras laddi
 †Ephippiorthoceras tenuistriatum
 †Eremotrema – tentative report
 †Eremotrema emacerata
 †Eridotrypa
 †Eridotrypa aedilis
 †Eridotrypa exigua
 †Erismodus
 †Erismodus quadridactylus
 †Eroicaspira
 †Eroicaspira bellicincta
 †Erratencrinurus
 †Erratencrinurus vigilans
 †Escharopora
 †Escharopora subrecta
 †Eukloedenella
 †Eukloedenella richmondensis
 †Eumorphocystis
 †Eunema
 †Eunema centralis
 †Eunema concinnula
 †Eunema helicteres
 †Eunema quadrisulcata
 †Eunema simile
 †Euomphalopsis
 †Euomphalopsis depressa – type locality for species
 †Euprimitia
 †Euprimitia celata
 †Euprimitia labiosa
 †Euprimitia linepunctata
 †Euprimitia sanctipauli
 †Eurychilina
 †Eurychilina cannonfallsensis – type locality for species
 †Eurychilina depressa
 †Eurychilina incurva
 †Eurychilina kayi – type locality for species
 †Eurychilina micropunctata – type locality for species
 †Eurychilina minutifoveata
 †Eurychilina partifimbriata
 †Eurychilina reticulata
 †Eurychilina subradiata
 †Eurychilina sugarcreekensis – type locality for species
 †Eurychilina ventrosa
 †Eurycystites
 †Eurycystites granosus
 †Eurymya
 †Eurymya plana
 †Eurystomites
 †Eurystomites kelloggi –

F

 †Fayettoceras – tentative report
 †Fayettoceras beloitense
 †Fisherities
  †Flexicalymene
 †Flexicalymene senaria
 †Floripatella
 †Floripatella humilis
 †Furcitella
 †Furcitella scofieldi
 †Fusispira
 †Fusispira angusta
 †Fusispira convexa
 †Fusispira inflata
 †Fusispira intermedia
 †Fusispira nobilis
 †Fusispira planulata
 †Fusispira spicula
 †Fusispira subbrevis
 †Fusispira subfusiformis
 †Fusispira ventricosa
 †Fusispira vittata –

G

  †Gabriceraurus
 †Gabriceraurus mifflinensis
 †Geisonoceras
 †Geisonoceras clermontense
 †Geisonoceras scofieldi
 †Globonema
 †Globonema niota
  †Glyptocrinus
 †Glyptocrinus ornatus – or unidentified related form
 †Glyptocrinus pustulosis
 †Glyptocrinus tridactylus
 †Glyptocystites
 †Glyptocystitid – type locality for genus
 †Glyptorthis
 †Glyptorthis bellarugosa
 †Glyptorthis insculpta
 †Gonioceras
 †Gonioceras anceps
 †Gonioceras homerense
 †Gonioceras kayi
 †Gonioceras occidentale
 †Goniophora
 †Goniophora absimilis
 †Gorbyoceras
 †Graptodictya
 †Graptodictya proava
 †Graptodictya simplex
 †Grenprisa
 †Grenprisa billingsi
  †Grewingkia
 †Gyronema
 †Gyronema pulchellum
 †Gyronema semicarinatum –

H

 †Hallatia
 †Hallatia convexa
 †Hallatia duplicata
 †Hallatia particylindrica
 †Halliella
 †Halliella magnipunctata
  †Hallopora
 †Hallopora dumalis
 †Hallopora goodhuensis
 †Hallopora multitabulata
 †Hallopora undulata
 †Hebertella
 †Hebertella occidentalis
 †Hebetoceras – tentative report
  †Helcionopsis
 †Helcionopsis depressum
 †Helcionopsis wisconsinensis
 †Helicotoma
 †Helicotoma planulata
 †Helopora
 †Helopora divaricata
 †Hemicystites
 †Hemicystites curtus
 †Hemicystites paulianus
 †Hemiphragma
 †Hemiphragma irrasum
 †Hemiphragma tenuimurale
 †Hesperidella
 †Hesperidella initialis
 †Hesperorthis
 †Hesperorthis tricenaria
 †Hindia
 †Hindia sphaeroidalis
 †Hiscobeccus
 †Hiscobeccus capax
  †Holopea
 †Holopea ampla
 †Holopea appressa
 †Holopea concinnula
 †Holopea excelsa
 †Holopea insignis
 †Holopea obliqua
 †Holopea paludiniformis
 †Holopea pyrene
 †Holopea rotunda
 †Holopea similis
 †Holopea supraplana
 †Holtedahilina
 †Holtedahilina emaciata
 †Homotrypa
 †Homotrypa subramosa
 †Homotrypella
 †Homotrypella cribrosa
 †Homotrypella hospitalis
 †Homotrypella instabilis
 †Horiostomella
 †Hormotoma
 †Hormotoma artemesia
 †Hormotoma cassina
 †Hormotoma gracilis
 †Hormotoma minnesotensis
 †Hormotoma multivolvis
 †Hormotoma neglecta
 †Hormotoma oehlerti
 †Hormotoma subangulata
 †Hudsonaster
 †Hudsonaster narrawayi
 †Hudsonaster rugosus – or unidentified related form
 †Hybocrinus
 †Hybocrinus conicus
 †Hypseloconus – type locality for genus
 †Hypseloconus cornutiformis – type locality for species
 †Hypseloconus elongatus – type locality for species
 †Hypsiptycha
 †Hypsiptycha anticostiensis –

I

 †Icriodella
 †Icriodella superba
 †Icriodus
 †Icriodus calvini – type locality for species
 †Icriodus orri – type locality for species
 †Idahoia
 †Idahoia serapia
 †Idahoia serapio
 †Idahoia wisconsensis
 †Idiospira
 †Idiospira panderi
  †Illaenus
 †Illaenus americanus
 †Ischadites
 †Ischadites iowensis
 †Isorthoceras
 †Isorthoceras junceum
 †Isorthoceras sociale
  †Isotelus
 †Isotelus gigas
 †Isotelus iowensis
 †Isotelus simplex
 †Isotelus susae
 †Isotomocrinus
 †Isotomocrinus minutus –

K

 †Kentlandoceras –
 †Kentlandoceras husseyi
 †Kentlandoceras schrocki – or unidentified comparable form
 †Kiesowia – tentative report
 †Kiesowia verrucosa
  †Kionoceras
 †Kionoceras decorahense
 †Kionoceras postvillense
 †Kionoceras tenuitectum
 †Kionoceras thomasi
 †Kirengella
 †Kirengella rectilateralis – type locality for species
 †Kirengella stabilis – type locality for species
 †Kokenospira
 †Kokenospira costalis – type locality for species
 †Krausella
 †Krausella arcuata
 †Krausella curtispina
 †Krausella inaequalis
 †Krausella variata –

L

 †Laccoprimitia
 †Laccoprimitia fillmorensis
 †Laddella
 †Laddella insueta
 †Lambeoceras
 †Lambeoceras confertum
 †Lambeoceras cultratum – or unidentified comparable form
 †Lecanospira
 †Lecanospira transversocordatus – type locality for species
 †Leperditella
 †Leperditella fryei
 †Leperditella macra
 †Leperditella millepunctata
 †Leperditella persimilis
 †Lepidocyclus
 †Lepidocyclus laddi
 †Lesueurilla
 †Lesueurilla beloitensis
 †Lichenaria
 †Lichenaria typa
  †Lingula
 †Lingula morsei
 †Lingula philomela
 †Lingulasma
 †Lingulasma galenensis
 †Lingulops
 †Liospira
 †Liospira americana
 †Liospira angustata
 †Liospira decipens
 †Liospira micula
 †Liospira modesta
 †Liospira obtusa
 †Liospira progne
 †Liospira vitruvia
 †Loganoceras
 †Lophospira
 †Lophospira decursa
 †Lophospira major
 †Lophospira milleri
 †Lophospira obliqua
 †Lophospira perangulata – type locality for species
 †Lophospira serrulata
 †Lophospira spironema
 †Lophospira ventricosa
 †Loxobucania
 †Loxobucania emmonsi
 †Loxobucania lindsleyi
 †Lyrodesma
 †Lyrodesma cannonense – type locality for species
 †Lytospira
 †Lytospira subrotunda
 †Lytospira undulatus –

M

 †Maclurina
 †Maclurina bigsbyi
 †Maclurina manitobensis
 †Maclurites
 †Maclurites crassa
 †Maclurites cuneata
 †Maclurites depressus
 †Maclurites nitidus
 †Maclurites subrotunda
 Macrocypris
 †Macrocypris kayi
 †Macrocyproides
 †Macrocyproides clermontensis
 †Macrocyprus
 †Macrocyprus kayi
 †Macronotella
 †Macronotella arcta
 †Macronotella scofeldi
 †Macronotella scofieldi
 †Manespira
 †Manespira nicolleti
 †Manitoulinoceras
 †Manitoulinoceras neleum
 †Manitoulinoceras warsawense
 †Manitoulinoceras wykoffense
 †Maratia
 †Maratia mana
 †Maratia mara
 †Maratia micula
 †Matheria
 †Megamyonia
 †Megamyonia unicostata
 †Merocrinus
 †Merocrinus britonensis
 †Metaspyroceras
 †Metaspyroceras clarkei
 †Metaspyroceras minneapolis
 †Metaspyroceras nicolleti
 †Metaspyroceras perlineatum
 †Metaspyroceras wisconsinense
 †Michelinoceras
 †Michelinoceras beltrami
 †Michelinoceras multicameratum
 †Microcoelodus
 †Milleratia
 †Milleratia cincinnatiensis
 †Mitoclema
 †Mitoclema mundulum
 †Mixoconus
 †Mixoconus primus
 †Modiolodon
 †Modiolopsis
 †Modiolopsis fountainensis
 †Modiolopsis gregalis
 †Modiolopsis nana – type locality for species
 †Monocheilus
 †Monocheilus anatinum
 †Monocheilus micros
 †Monocyclic
 †Monocyclic inadunate
 †Monotrypa
 †Multioistodus
 †Myeinocystites
 †Myeinocystites crossmani –

N

 †Nanno
 †Nanno aulema
 †Nasutimena
 †Nasutimena fluctuosa – or unidentified comparable form
 †Nematopora
 †Nematopora conferta
 †Nematopora consueta
 †Nematopora ovalis
 †Neobothriocidaris
 †Neobothriocidaris templetoni
 †Neocoleodus
 †Neopanderodus
 †Ningulella
 †Ningulella paucisulcata
 †Nodambichilina
 †Nodambichilina symmetrica
 †Nuculites –

O

 †Oepikina
 †Oepikina inquassa
 †Oepikina minnesotensis
 †Oistodus
 †Oistodus abundans
 †Oistodus venustus
 †Omospira
 †Omospira laticincta
 †Omospira trentonensis
 †Oneotodus
 †Oneotodus ovatus
 †Onniella
 †Onniella porrecta
 †Onniella quadrata
 †Onoceras
 †Onoceras abruptum
 †Onoceras douglassi
 †Onoceras tetreauvillense
 †Ophileta
 †Ophiletina
 †Ophiletina angularis
 †Ophiletina fausta
 †Ophiletina sublaxa
 †Opikatia
 †Opikatia emaciata
 †Opikatia rotunda
 †Orbiculoidea
 †Orbiculoidea lamellosa – or unidentified comparable form
 †Orbiculoidea pelopea
 †Ormoceras – tentative report
 †Ormoceras maquoketense
  †Orthoceras
 †Orthoceras beltrami
 †Orthoceras minnesotense
 †Orthodesma
 †Orthodesma canaliculatum
 †Orthodesma caniculatum
 †Orthodesma litoralis
 †Orthograptus
 †Oulodus
 †Oulodus serratus
 †Oxoplecia
 †Oxoplecia ulrichi
 †Ozarkodina
 †Ozarkodina concinna
 †Ozarkodina delecta
 †Ozarkodina raaschi –

P

 †Pachydictya
 †Pachydictya elegans
 †Pachyglossella
 †Pachyglossella elderi
 †Pachyglossella riciniformis
 †Palaeocrinus
 †Palaeocrinus angulatus
 †Palaeoglossa
 †Palaeoglossa hurlburti
 †Palaeoneilo
 †Paleocrinus
 †Paleocrinus angulatus
 †Panderodus
 †Panderodus feulneri
 †Panderodus gracilis
 †Panderodus panderi
 †Parabolbina
 †Parabolbina antecedans
 †Parabolbina carinifera
 †Parabolbina staufferi
 †Paraliospira
 †Paraliospira abrupta
 †Paraliospira supracingulata
 †Paraschmidtella
 †Paraschmidtella irregularis
 †Paraschmidtella uphami
 †Parastrophina
 †Parastrophina berensis
 †Parastrophina bernensis
 †Parastrophina rotundiformis
 †Parenthatia
 †Parenthatia camerata
 †Parenthatia punctata
 †Parschmidtella
 †Parschmidtella uphami
 †Paucicrura
 †Paucicrura corpulenta
 †Paucicrura rogata
 †Paupospira
 †Paupospira burginensis
 †Paupospira elevata
 †Paupospira oweni
 †Paupospira sumnerensis
 †Pedomphalella
 †Pedomphalella intermedia
 †Pedomphalella subovata
 †Periglyptocrinus
 †Periglyptocrinus spinuliferus
 †Periodon
 †Periodon grandis
 †Petrocrania
 †Petrocrania halli
 †Petrocrania trentonensis
 †Phialaspongia – type locality for genus
 †Phialaspongia fossa – type locality for species
 †Phragmodus
 †Phragmodus cognitus
 †Phragmodus inflexus
 †Phragmodus undatus
 †Phragmolites
 †Phragmolites compressus
 †Phragmolites dyeri
 †Phragmolites fimbriata
 †Phragmolites obliquus
 †Phragmolites triangularis
 †Phyllodictya
 †Phyllodictya varia
 †Pinodema
 †Pinodema conradi
 †Pionodema
 †Pionodema circularis
 †Pionodema subaequata
  †Plaesiomys
 †Plaesiomys meedsi
 †Plaesiomys proavitus
 †Plaesiomys subquadrata
  †Platystrophia
 †Platystrophia amoena
 †Platystrophia biforata
 †Platystrophia extensa – tentative report
 †Platystrophia trentonensis
 †Plectoceras
 †Plectoceras occidentale
 †Plectoceras robertsoni
 †Plectodina
 †Plectodina aculeata
 †Plectodina tenuis
 †Plectorthis
 †Plectorthis plicatella
 †Plethocardia
 †Plethocardia suberecta
 †Plethospira
 †Plethospira cannonensis – type locality for species
 †Plethospira cassina
  †Pleurocystites
 †Pleurocystites squamosus
 †Polygammoceras
 †Polygammoceras prestonense
  †Polygnathus
 †Polygnathus curtigladius
 †Polygnathus intermedius
 †Polygnathus linguiformis
 †Polygnathus parawebbi
 †Polygrammoceras
 †Polygrammoceras prestonense
 †Polyplacognathus
 †Polyplacognathus ramosus
 †Porocrinus
 †Porocrinus elegans
 †Porocrinus fayettensis
 †Porocrinus pentagonius
 †Porocrinus smithi – or unidentified related form
 †Praepleurocystis
 †Prasopora
 †Prasopora insularis
 †Primitella
 †Primitella constricta
 †Primitella plattevillensis
 †Primitia
 †Primitia cannonensis – type locality for species
 †Primitia gibbera
 †Primitia mammata
 †Primitia spinata
 †Primitia tumidula
 †Primitiella
 †Primitiella bellevuensis
 †Primitiella carlei
 †Primitiella constricta
 †Primitiella milleri
 †Primitiella plattevillensis
 †Primitiopsis – tentative report
 †Primitiopsis bella
 †Probillingsites
 †Probillingsites milleri
 †Probillingsites pronis
 †Probillingsites welleri
 †Prolobella
 †Promopalaeaster
 †Promopalaeaster wilsoni
 †Proplina
 †Proplina convexum – type locality for species
 †Proplina cornutaformis – type locality for species
 †Proplina corpulentum – type locality for species
 †Proplina extensum – type locality for species
 †Prosaukia
 †Prosaukia ambigua
 †Prosaukia misa
 †Proteroconus
 †Proteroconus capuloides – type locality for species
 †Protopanderodus
 †Protopanderodus liripipus
 †Pseudagnostus
 †Pseudagnostus josephus
 †Pseudolingula
 †Pseudolingula eva
 †Pseudolingula iowensis
 †Pseudoprimitella
 †Pseudoprimitella unicornis
 †Pseudulrichia
 †Pseudulrichia simplex
 †Psuedulrichia
 †Psuedulrichia simplex
 †Pterinea
 †Pterotheca
 †Pterotheca attenuata
 †Pterygometopus
 †Pterygometopus sclerops – or unidentified comparable form
 †Ptiloconus
 †Ptilodictya – tentative report
 †Ptychaspis
 †Ptychaspis granulosa
 †Ptychaspis miniscaensis
 †Ptychaspis striata
 †Ptychaspis tuberosa
 †Ptychocrinus
 †Punctaparchites
 †Punctaparchites rugosus
 †Punctaparchites splendens
 †Pycnocrinus
 †Pycnocrinus gerki
 †Pycnocrinus multibrachialis
 †Pycnocrinus sardesoni
 †Pyrgocystis
 †Pyrgocystis sardesoni –

Q

 †Quasibollia –
 †Quasibollia persulcata
 †Quasibollia ridicula
 †Quienquecaudex
 †Quienquecaudex springeri –

R

 †Rafinesquina –
 †Rafinesquina deltoidea
 †Rafinesquina nitans
 †Rafinesquina trentonensis
 †Raphistoma
 †Raphistoma shakopeense – type locality for species
 †Raphistomina
 †Raphistomina lapicida
 †Raphistomina rugata
 †Raymondatia
 †Raymondatia goniglypta
 †Redpathoceras – tentative report
 †Reedsoceras
 †Reedsoceras macrostomum
 †Reteocrinus
 †Reteocrinus rocktonensis
 †Reteocrinus spinosus
 †Rhaphanocrinus
 †Rhaphanocrinus buckleyi
 †Rhaphistomina
 †Rhaphistomina rugata
 †Rhinidictya
 †Rhynchotrema
 †Rhynchotrema ainsliei
 †Rhynchotrema laticosta
 †Rhynchotrema wisconsinense
 †Rhytimya
 †Richardsonoceras
 †Richardsonoceras beloitense
 †Richardsonoceras clarkei
 †Richardsonoceras romingeri
 †Richardsonoceras scofieldi
 †Richardsonoceras simplex
 †Rigidella
 †Rigidella cannonensis – type locality for species
 †Rioceras
 †Rioceras consuetum – tentative report
 †Rosticellula
 †Rosticellula colei
 Rostricellula
 †Rostricellula minnesotensis –

S

 †Saccelatia
 †Saccelatia angularis
 †Saccelatia arcuamuralis
 †Saccelatia arrecta
 †Saccelatia bullata
 †Saccelatia cletifera
 †Saffordia
 †Salpingostoma
 †Salpingostoma buelli
 †Salpingostoma imbricata
 †Salpingostoma sculptilis
 †Saratogia
 †Saratogia hamula
 †Scaevogyra
 †Scaevogyra swezeyi – type locality for species
 †Scalenocystites
 †Scalenocystites strimplei
 †Scalites
 †Scalites peracutum
  †Scenella
 †Scenella compressa
 †Scenella obtusa
 †Sceptaspis
 †Sceptaspis lincolnensis
 †Schizambon
 †Schizocrania
 †Schizocrania filosa
 †Schmidtella
 †Schmidtella affinis
 †Schmidtella brevis
 †Schmidtella lacunosa
 †Schuchertia
 †Schuchertoceras
 †Schuchertoceras thomasi
 †Scofieldia
 †Scofieldia bilateralis
 †Scofieldoceras
 †Scofieldoceras depressum
 †Scofieldoceras shumardi
 †Scyphiodus
 †Scyphiodus primus
 †Similodonta
 †Simulites
 †Simulites concinnus
 †Sinuites
 †Sinuites cancellatus
 †Sinuites pervoluta
 †Sinuites rectangularis
 †Sinuites subcompressa – type locality for species
 †Sivertsia
 †Skenidioides
 †Skenidioides anthonense
 †Sowerbyella
 †Sowerbyella curdsvillensis
 †Sowerbyella minnesotensis
 †Spatiopora
 †Spatiopora lineata
 †Sphenolium
 †Sphenosphaera
 †Sphenosphaera platystoma
 †Sphenosphaera rogersensis
 †Spyroceras
 †Spyroceras cylindratum
 †Spyroceras lesueuri
 †Spyroceras perroti – or unidentified comparable form
 †Spyroceras scofieldi
 †Staufferella
 †Staufferella falcata
 †Staufferoceras
 †Staufferoceras featherstonhaughi
 †Stereoconus
 †Stereoconus gracilis
 †Stictopora
 †Stictopora dumosa
 †Stictopora exigua
 †Stictopora lita
 †Stictopora minima
 †Stictopora mutabilis
 †Stictopora neglecta – or unidentified comparable form
 †Stictopora paupera
 †Stictoporella
 †Stictoporella angularis
 †Stictoporella cribrosa
 †Stictoporella frondifera
 †Stictoporella gracilis
 †Stigmacephalus
 †Stigmacephalus flexifrons
 †Stigmaspis
 †Stigmaspis hudsonensis
 †Stigmatella
 †Stigmatella claviformis
 †Strepsodiscus
 †Strepsodiscus franconiensis – type locality for species
 †Strepsodiscus strongi
 †Streptelasma
 †Streptelasma corniculum
  †Strophomena
 †Strophomena billingsi
 †Strophomena filitexta
 †Strophomena incurvata
 †Strophomena occidentalis
 †Strophomena planodorsata
 †Strophomena plattinensis – or unidentified comparable form
 †Strophomena septata
 †Strophomena trilobata
 †Strophomena trilobita
 †Stylocyrtoceras
 †Stylocyrtoceras tantillum – type locality for species
 †Subulites
 †Subulites conradi
 †Subulites dixonenesis
 †Subulites elongatus
 †Subulites pergracilis
 †Subulites regularis
 †Sygcaulocrinus
 †Sygcaulocrinus typus –

T

 †Tanaocystis
 †Tancrediopsis
 †Technophorus
 †Technophorus divaricatus
 †Teichertoceras
 †Teichertoceras husseyi – or unidentified comparable form
 †Tetradella
 †Tetradella ellipsilira
 †Tetradella subquadrans
 †Tetradella ulrichi
 †Tetranota
 †Tetranota bidorsata
 †Tetranota macra
 †Tetranota obsoleta
 †Tetranota sexcarinata
 †Tetranota wisconsinensis
 †Tetraprioniodus
 †Tetraprioniodus breviconus
 †Thaleops
 †Thaleops ovata
 †Thomasatia
 †Thomasatia falcicosta
 †Thuroholia
 †Thuroholia cribriformis
 †Thuroholia croneisi
 †Traskocrinus
 †Traskocrinus mahlburgi
 †Trematis
 †Trematis huronensis
 †Trematopora
 †Trematopora primigenia
 †Trichinocrinus – or unidentified related form
 †Triconodella
 †Triconodella flexa
 †Trigrammaria
 †Trigrammaria winchelli
 †Tripteroceras
 †Tripteroceras oweni
 †Tripteroceras planoconvexum
 †Tripteroceras scofieldi
 †Trochonema
 †Trochonema altum
 †Trochonema beachi
 †Trochonema beloitense
 †Trochonema fragile
 †Trochonema retrorsum
 †Trochonema rugosa
 †Trochonema subcrassum
 †Trochonema umbilicata
 †Trochonema vagrans
  †Tryblidium
 †Tryblidium exserta –

U

 †Ulrichaster –
 †Ulrichaster ulrichi
 †Ulrichia
 †Ulrichia saccula
 †Ulrichoceras
 †Ulrichoceras beloitense
  †Urasterella
 †Valcouroceras
 †Vanuxemia
 †Vanuxemia dixonensis
 †Vellamo
 †Vellamo americana –

W

 †Westonoceras
 †Westonoceras iowense
 †Westonoceras minnesotense
 †Whiteavesia
 †Whiteavesites
 †Whitfieldoceras
 †Whitfieldoceras clarkei
 †Whitfieldoceras exiguum – or unidentified comparable form
 †Whitfieldoceras minimum
 †Whitfieldoceras mumiaforme
 †Wilbernia
 †Wilbernia pero
 †Willmanocystis
 †Willmanocystis denticulatus
 †Winchellatia
 †Winchellatia ceratopea – type locality for species
 †Winchellatia lansingensis
 †Winchellatia longispina
 †Winchellatia minnesotensis
 †Winchellatia minnsotensis –

Z

 †Zittelloceras
 †Zittelloceras beloitense
 †Zittelloceras brevicurvatum
 †Zittelloceras clarkeanum
 †Zittelloceras percurvatum
 †Zittelloceras scofieldi
 †Zittelloceras tenuistriatum
 †Zygobolboides
 †Zygobolboides calvini
 †Zygobolboides grafensis
 †Zygobolboides iowensis
 †Zygobolboides thomasi
 †Zygospira
 †Zygospira lebanonensis
 †Zygospira modesta
 †Zygospira plinthii – type locality for species
 †Zygospira uphami

References
 

Paleozoic
Minnesota